Raheem Morris (born September 3, 1976) is an American football coach who is the defensive coordinator for the Los Angeles Rams of the National Football League (NFL). He previously served as head coach for the Tampa Bay Buccaneers from 2009 to 2011 and interim head coach for the Atlanta Falcons in 2020. Morris also was an assistant coach for the Falcons, Washington Redskins, and the Buccaneers.

Coaching career

Early years
Morris graduated from Hofstra University with a degree in physical education in 1998 after playing safety at Hofstra from 1994 to 1997. That same year he began his collegiate coaching career as a graduate assistant coach at Hofstra University, where he was responsible for coaching the offensive scout team, developing scouting reports and handling video breakdown and computer input and analysis. In 1999, he was hired by Cornell University as their defensive backs coach and special teams assistant. After 1999, he returned to Hofstra as defensive backs coach. He also spent time in 2001 as a defensive minority intern with the New York Jets.

Tampa Bay Buccaneers (first stint)
Before the 2002 season, Morris was hired by the Buccaneers to become their defensive quality control coach, where he helped them have the top-ranked defense and win the franchise's first ever Super Bowl, beating the Oakland Raiders 48–21 in Super Bowl XXXVII. In 2003, he became a defensive assistant. From 2004 to 2005 he was the assistant defensive backs coach. After 2005 he went to Kansas State to be their defensive coordinator.

Kansas State
Morris spent one season with the Kansas State Wildcats in 2006, as defensive coordinator under then-head coach Ron Prince. He helped improve the defense in several statistical categories including total defense, scoring defense and pass defense. He helped the Wildcats upset the #4 Texas Longhorns during the 2006 season.

Tampa Bay Buccaneers (second stint)
Before the 2007 season, Morris returned to the Buccaneers to be their defensive backs coach, replacing Greg Burns. After the team's pass defense fell to 19th in 2006, Morris helped the pass defense achieve the league's top ranking in 2007.

Head coach
In December 2008, it was announced that Morris would take over as defensive coordinator for the Buccaneers for the 2009 season after Monte Kiffin announced that he would be leaving the team to join his son, Lane Kiffin, at Tennessee. Just a month later on January 16, 2009, head coach Jon Gruden was fired by the Buccaneers and Morris was named the team's head coach. Morris had also interviewed for head coach with the Denver Broncos before being hired by Tampa Bay.

After starting the season 0–7, Morris earned his first victory as a head coach in week 9 against the Green Bay Packers. On November 24, 2009 Morris took over defensive coordinator duties after relieving Jim Bates of his duties. He finished his first year as the head coach, leading the team to last in the NFC South with a 3–13 record. In his second season, the team finished 10–6, barely missing the playoffs.  That seven game turnaround was the best in franchise history. In 2010, Morris became the first coach since the 1970 NFL/AFL merger to start at least 10 rookies and finish with a winning record.

During Week 13 of the 2011 NFL season, against the Carolina Panthers, Morris banished defensive tackle Brian Price to the sideline after Price shoved Panthers guard Mackenzy Bernadeau well after the end of a third-quarter play in which Cam Newton was sacked for a four-yard loss. Price was penalized for unnecessary roughness. Morris was incensed because the sack would have forced the Panthers into a 3rd-and-14 situation. However, the resulting 15-yard penalty gave the Panthers a first down, allowing them to complete a touchdown drive that put the game out of reach (the Panthers won 38–19). After the game, a visibly angry Morris called Price's actions "foolish" and "selfish." The move drew comparisons to then San Francisco 49ers coach Mike Singletary banishing Vernon Davis from the sideline after a personal foul in 2008. On January 2, 2012, Morris was fired as head coach of the Buccaneers after a 4–12 season, including losing their last 10 games.

Washington Redskins
On January 11, 2012, Morris was hired by the Washington Redskins as their defensive backs coach.

Atlanta Falcons
On January 26, 2015, it was announced Morris was joining the Atlanta Falcons as assistant head coach/defensive backs. On January 25, 2016, Morris was named the wide receivers coach and no longer the defensive backs coach.

In the 2016 season, Morris and the Falcons reached Super Bowl LI, where they faced the New England Patriots on February 5, 2017. In the Super Bowl, the Falcons fell in a 34–28 overtime defeat.

On November 4, 2019, Morris was reassigned to secondary coach.

On December 27, 2019, Morris was promoted to defensive coordinator for the 2020 NFL season.

On October 12, 2020, Morris was promoted to interim head coach, following the firing of Dan Quinn after an 0–5 start to the season. The Falcons finished with 4–7 record under Morris but finished with a 4–12 overall record and 4th in the NFC South.

Los Angeles Rams
On January 21, 2021, Morris was hired by the Los Angeles Rams as defensive coordinator under head coach Sean McVay, replacing Brandon Staley, who left to become the head coach of the Los Angeles Chargers. On February 13, 2022, Morris won his second Super Bowl as the Rams defeated the Cincinnati Bengals in Super Bowl LVI.

Head coaching record

* Interim head coach

References

External links
 Los Angeles Rams bio

1976 births
Living people
American football defensive backs
Atlanta Falcons coaches
Atlanta Falcons head coaches
Cornell Big Red football coaches
Hofstra Pride football coaches
Hofstra Pride football players
Irvington High School (New Jersey) alumni
Kansas State Wildcats football coaches
National Football League defensive coordinators
Tampa Bay Buccaneers coaches
Tampa Bay Buccaneers head coaches
Washington Redskins coaches
People from Irvington, New Jersey
Sportspeople from Essex County, New Jersey
Coaches of American football from New Jersey
Players of American football from New Jersey
African-American coaches of American football
African-American players of American football
Los Angeles Rams coaches
21st-century African-American sportspeople
20th-century African-American sportspeople